Eubulus ( Euboulos; fl. 4th-century BCE) was a banker from Bithynia, a region on the south shore of the Black Sea.  He once lent money to a Persian official, taking the lands of Assos and Atarneus in Aiolis (Aeolis) in Asia Minor as security, and thus became ruler of the two realms.  He is most famous for his connection to his slave Hermias, who inherited the position of ruler of the city.  It was Hermias who invited Xenocrates and Aristotle to his court, and later became Aristotle's father-in-law.

References

Diogenes Laërtius, Life of Aristotle. Translated by C.D. Yonge.
Athenaeus of Naucratis, The Deipnosophists, Book XV, 696a.

4th-century BC Greek people
Ancient Greek rulers
Ancient Greek bankers
People from Bithynia
Year of birth unknown
Year of death unknown
People from the Achaemenid Empire